Nõmme may refer to several places in Estonia:

Nõmme, district of Tallinn
Nõmme (subdistrict), subdistrict in Nõmme District, Tallinn
Nõmme, Hiiumaa Parish, village in Hiiumaa Parish, Hiiu County
Nõmme, Jõgeva County, village in Mustvee Parish, Jõgeva County
Nõmme, Lääne-Nigula Parish, village in Lääne-Nigula Parish, Lääne County
Nõmme, Haapsalu, village in Haapsalu City, Lääne County
Nõmme, Lääne-Viru County, village in Väike-Maarja Parish, Lääne-Viru County
Nõmme, Pärnu County, village in Lääneranna Parish, Pärnu County
Nõmme, Rapla County, village in Rapla Parish, Rapla County
Nõmme, Saaremaa Parish, village in Saaremaa Parish, Saare County